Hein van Breenen (12 June 1929 – 8 March 1990) was a Dutch racing cyclist. He rode the Tour de France in 1952–1955 with the best result of 20th place in 1954; that year he finished within the podium at three Tour de France stages. Next year he ended 11th overall at the Giro d'Italia.

References

1929 births
1990 deaths
Dutch male cyclists
Cyclists from Amsterdam
20th-century Dutch people